Abel de Lima Salazar (19 July 1889, Guimarães - 29 December 1946, Lisbon), was a Portuguese physician, lecturer, researcher, writer and painter who worked and lived in Porto. He was the son of Adolfo Barroso Pereira Salazar (Guimarães, 20 October 1858 – Porto, 1 January 1941) and wife Adelaide da Luz da Silva e Lima (– Porto, 3 October 1929).

Founded in 1975, the Instituto de Ciências Biomédicas Abel Salazar (in English Abel Salazar Biomedical Sciences Institute), a research center and biosciences school of the University of Porto, was named after him.

He was an anti-fascist and his painting with his social references anticipates the neo-realist movement in the Portuguese painting.

Biography

Life

Work

Scientific work

Artistic work

Drawings

Paintings and sculpture

Literary and philosophical work

Museum

External links
Abel Salazar's Museum Virtual Tour
Abel Salazar in Vidas Lusófonas
Casa Museu Abel Salazar

1889 births
1946 deaths
People from Guimarães
Portuguese scientists
Portuguese artists
Portuguese male writers
Portuguese anti-fascists
University of Porto alumni
20th-century Portuguese painters
20th-century male artists
Portuguese male painters